Bhagan Bigha is a village near Bihar Sharif, in the Nalanda district of Bihar state, India. The village is situated on the National Highway 20 and state highway 78.

Villages in Nalanda district